HD 37811 (HR 1958) is a solitary star in the southern constellation Columba. It has an apparent magnitude of 5.44, allowing it to be faintly seen with the naked eye.

HD 37811 has a stellar classification of G6/8 III — intermediate between a G6 and G8 giant star that is currently on the red giant branch. It has 3 times the mass of the Sun but has expanded to 11.7 times its girth at an age of 440 million years.

References

Columba (constellation)
G-type giants
CD-32 02479
037811
026649
1958
Columbae, 39